Trigonopterus costipennis is a species of flightless weevil in the genus Trigonopterus from Indonesia.

Etymology
The specific name is derived from the Latin words costa, meaning "rib" or "ridge", and penna, meaning "elytron".  It refers to the shape of the species' elytra.

Description
Individuals measure 2.04–2.51 mm in length.  The body is elongated and slightly ovate.  General coloration is black, with rust-colored tarsi and antennae.

Range

References

costipennis
Beetles described in 2014
Beetles of Asia
Insects of Indonesia